Fold Zandura is an alternative rock band from California. They released four albums between 1995 and 1999, plus one white 7" vinyl. Each album was released under a different label. The two premier members also founded the industrial band Mortal. Their songs are "love songs and praise songs" according to Jyro. Though they are presently involved in other projects, Fold Zandura's website maintains that "the band's not officially dead".

The band
Jyro Xhan (vocals, guitar, programming)
Jerome Fontamillas (bass, programming, vocals)
Frank Lenz (drums, vocals)
Kevin Pollard (other live shows)
Joey Marchiano (drums)
Joey Anderson (guitar)
David Chang (guitar live shows)

History
Fold Zandura was formed in December 1995 after the breakup of Jyro and Jerome's previous band, Mortal. They hired drummer Frank Lenz and self-released their eponymous debut. In 1997, they released two albums, the first titled Return and featuring five re-recorded songs from their debut, plus two new songs and an instrumental. They made a video for "Ember" that was filmed in a hospital. Later that year, they released their major label debut, Ultraforever, on BEC Recordings. This time, their new album contained 14 new songs and two songs from Fold Zandura. They made a music video for "Deep Surround" and also recorded two non-album tracks for two BEC compilations. Moms Like Us Too Vol. 1 featured "Serena," and Happy Christmas featured "Asia Minor". Soon thereafter, Frank Lenz left the band in order to be closer to his family, although he would continue to play at concerts close to home.

In 1999, they independently released a seven song EP called King Planet. The band members were listed simply as Jyro and Jerome, although Jyro's wife Carla does vocals on one track. The album was available exclusively through their website and a few Christian music stores.

In 2000, Jerome Fontamillas joined Switchfoot as a session musician. He later joined them full-time. The following year, "King Planet" was featured on the soundtrack to the film Extreme Days. In early 2002, Jyro released Juggernautz, a side project without Jerome on Metro One Music. Jyro Xhan lead the band, LCNA (Lucena), under the pseudonym initials, JFM, until December, 2009, according to the band's expired MySpace page. He also works with Crystal Lewis and various other bands as producer, engineer, guitar, and keyboard player.

In July 2022, Jyro and Jerome announced the formation of a new group, MorZan (combination of their former band names) and began releasing information via their Facebook and Instagram pages as @MorzanMuzik and the band website, MorzanMuzik.com

Discography
Fold Zandura (1995) Xhan Records
Return (1997) Sub•Lime Records
The White 7" (1997) Velvet Blue Music
Ultraforever (1997) BEC Recordings
King Planet (1999) Nowhere Music, Review: HM Magazine

References

External links
Fold Zandura Official Website
Fold Zandura's Myspace page
Mortal/Fold Zandura discography, including the info file, the oldest Mortal/Fold Zandura fan site, by John Turpin
The Sock Heaven BitTorrent Tracker, which provides downloads of a Fold Zandura live show, plus Mortal's early and demo work as Mortal Wish, via BitTorrent
Bio from Sub*Lime Records days, hosted at sublimerecords.com. Available through the Internet Archive.
Mortal/Fold Zandura fan site that features full lyrics
Fold Zandura Interview
Morzan Announcement

Alternative rock groups from California
Christian rock groups from California
Musical groups established in 1995